Arctosomma is a monotypic genus of spiders in the family Lycosidae. It was first described by Carl Friedrich Roewer in 1960. , it contains only one species, Arctosomma trochosiforme, found in Ethiopia.

References

Endemic fauna of Ethiopia
Lycosidae
Monotypic Araneomorphae genera
Spiders of Africa
Taxa named by Carl Friedrich Roewer